Ivana Bojdová is a Slovak midfielder currently playing for Unia Racibórz in the Polish Ekstraliga. She previously played for Slovan Duslo Šaľa in the Slovak First League. She has played the Champions League with both teams.

She is a member of the Slovak national team since 2001.

References

1985 births
Living people
Women's association football midfielders
Slovak women's footballers
Slovakia women's international footballers
Slovak expatriate footballers
Slovak expatriate sportspeople in Poland
Expatriate women's footballers in Poland
FK Slovan Duslo Šaľa (women) players
RTP Unia Racibórz players